Stethotes is a genus of leaf beetles in the subfamily Eumolpinae. It is distributed in Southeast Asia and the Western Pacific.

Species
Species include:

 Stethotes aenea Medvedev, 2009
 Stethotes aethiops Medvedev, 2009
 Stethotes ajax Gressitt, 1966
 Stethotes apicalis Gressitt, 1966
 Stethotes apicicornis Baly, 1867
 Stethotes arachnoides Medvedev, 2009
 Stethotes armata Medvedev, 2009
 Stethotes atra Baly, 1867
 Stethotes balyi Medvedev, 2009
 Stethotes basalis Jacoby, 1884
 Stethotes basifasciata Medvedev, 2009
 Stethotes basipennis Medvedev, 2009
 Stethotes bicolor Gressitt, 1966
 Stethotes bryanti Medvedev, 2009
 Stethotes carbonaria Medvedev, 2009
 Stethotes carinata Medvedev, 2009
 Stethotes coerulea Bryant, 1941
 Stethotes coerulescens Gressitt, 1966
 Stethotes consimilis Baly, 1867
 Stethotes costipennis Medvedev, 2009
 Stethotes cryptorrhynchodes Gressitt, 1966
 Stethotes cyanella (Boisduval, 1835)
 Stethotes dentata Medvedev, 2009
 Stethotes elegantula (Baly, 1864)
 Stethotes fulvicornis Medvedev, 2009
 Stethotes fulvilabris Lefèvre, 1890
 Stethotes granulifrons Medvedev, 2009
 Stethotes gressitti Medvedev, 2009
 Stethotes hirticollis Medvedev, 2009
 Stethotes hirtipes Jacoby, 1884
 Stethotes integra Jacoby, 1905
 Stethotes iriana Medvedev, 2009
 Stethotes jacobyi Medvedev, 2009
 Stethotes javarere Gressitt, 1966
 Stethotes kiungae Gressitt, 1966
 Stethotes laeana Gressitt, 1966
 Stethotes laevicollis Medvedev, 2009
 Stethotes lata Gressitt, 1966
 Stethotes lateralis (Baly, 1864)
 Stethotes latifasciata Gressitt, 1966
 Stethotes leleta Gressitt, 1966
 Stethotes longicollis Baly, 1867
 Stethotes longimana Lefèvre, 1890
 Stethotes loriae Jacoby, 1905
 Stethotes melastomae Gressitt, 1966
 Stethotes mimica Gressitt, 1966
 Stethotes minuta Jacoby, 1905
 Stethotes nigrescens Medvedev, 2009
 Stethotes nigripalpis Medvedev, 2009
 Stethotes nigritula Baly, 1867
 Stethotes nigrocoerulea (Baly, 1864)
 Stethotes nigroviridis Jacoby, 1884
 Stethotes obscura Medvedev, 2009
 Stethotes obscurata Medvedev, 2009
 Stethotes papuana Medvedev, 2009
 Stethotes pubifrons Weise, 1910
 Stethotes punctissima Gressitt, 1966
 Stethotes punctulata Bryant, 1950
 Stethotes riedeli Medvedev, 2009
 Stethotes rubripes Medvedev, 2009
 Stethotes rubrofasciata Bryant, 1950
 Stethotes rufipes Bryant, 1946
 Stethotes rufonigra Maulik, 1929
 Stethotes rufula Medvedev, 2009
 Stethotes schawalleri Medvedev, 2009
 Stethotes semicastanea Gressitt, 1966
 Stethotes setosa Gressitt, 1957
 Stethotes similis Gressitt, 1966
 Stethotes simonthomasi Gressitt, 1966
 Stethotes submetallica Gressitt, 1966
 Stethotes suturalis Bryant, 1950
 Stethotes sylvarum Gressitt, 1966
 Stethotes tarsalis Medvedev, 2009
 Stethotes tarsata Baly, 1867
 Stethotes telnovi Medvedev, 2017
 Stethotes tristis Medvedev, 2009
 Stethotes virida Gressitt, 1966
 Stethotes viridissima Medvedev, 2009

The following species have been moved to other genera:
 Stethotes bertiae Jolivet, Verma & Mille, 2007: moved to Acronymolpus
 Stethotes jourdani Jolivet, Verma & Mille, 2013: moved to Acronymolpus
 Stethotes mandjeliae Jolivet, Verma & Mille, 2010: moved to Taophila

References

Eumolpinae
Chrysomelidae genera
Beetles of Asia
Beetles of Oceania
Taxa named by Joseph Sugar Baly